Maniry is a town and commune in southwestern Madagascar. It belongs to the district of Ampanihy, which is a part of Atsimo-Andrefana Region. The population of the commune was estimated to be approximately 7,000 in 2001 commune census.

Only primary schooling is available. It is also a site of industrial-scale  mining. The majority 95% of the population of the commune are farmers, while an additional 3% receives their livelihood from raising livestock. The most important crop is rice, while other important products are peanuts, maize and cassava.  Industry and services provide employment for 0.5% and 1% of the population, respectively. Additionally fishing employs 0.5% of the population.

References and notes 

Populated places in Atsimo-Andrefana